In recreational mathematics, arithmetic billiards provide a geometrical method to determine the least common multiple and the greatest common divisor of two natural numbers by making use of reflections inside a rectangle whose sides are the two given numbers. This is an easy example of trajectory analysis of dynamical billiards. 
 
Arithmetic billiards have been discussed as mathematical puzzles by Hugo Steinhaus and Martin Gardner, and are known to mathematics teachers under the name 'Paper Pool'.
They have been used as a source of questions in mathematical circles.

The arithmetic billiard path

Consider a rectangle with integer sides, and construct a path inside this rectangle as follows:

 start in a corner, and move along the straight line which makes a 45° angle with the sides; 
 every time that the path hits a side, reflect it with the same angle (the path makes either a left or a right 90° turn);
 eventually (i.e. after a finite number of reflections) the path hits a corner and there it stops.

If one side length divides the other, the path is a zigzag consisting of one or more segments.
Else, the path has self-intersections and consists of segments of various lengths in two orthogonal directions.
In general, the path is the intersection of the rectangle with a grid of squares (oriented at 45° w.r.t. the rectangle sides).

Arithmetical features of the path 

Call  and  the side lengths of the rectangle, and divide this into  unit squares.

Suppose that none of the two side lengths divides the other. Then the first segment of the arithmetic billiard path contains the point of self-intersection which is closest to the starting point. The greatest common divisor  is the number of unit squares crossed by the first segment of the path up to that point of self-intersection.

The number of bouncing points for the arithmetic billiard path on the two sides of length  equals , and similarly  for the two sides of length .

The path is symmetric: if the starting and the ending corner are opposite, then the path is pointsymmetric w.r.t. the center of the rectangle, else it is symmetric with respect to the bisector of the side connecting the starting and the ending corner.

The contact points between the arithmetic billiard path and the rectangle perimeter are evenly distributed: the distance along the perimeter (i.e. possibly going around the corner) between two such neighbouring points equals .

Then any point on the arithmetic billiard path which has integer coordinates has the property that the sum of the coordinates is even (the parity cannot change by moving along diagonals of unit squares).

Ideas of proof 

Reflecting the billiard: Consider a square with side . By displaying multiple copies of the original rectangle (with mirror symmetry) we can visualise the arithmetic billiard path as a diagonal of that square. In other words, we can think of reflecting the rectangle rather than the path segments.

Reversing the time: The motion of the path is “time reversible”, meaning that if the path is currently traversing one particular unit square
(in a particular direction), then there is absolutely no doubt from which unit square and from which direction it just came.

The proof can be found in a popularization article.

One generalisation 

If we allow the starting point of the path to be any point in the rectangle with integer coordinates, then there are also periodic paths unless the rectangle sides are coprime. The length of any periodic path equals .

References 

Recreational mathematics